Robert Moskwa (born 13 October 1965 in Wrocław) is a Polish actor.

Filmography 

 2007: Tylko miłość as Paweł Nadolski
 2007: Manfred Tryb
 2004–present: M jak miłość as doctor Artur Rogowski
 1998-1999: Życie jak poker as receptionist
 1991: Kroll as Bogunia
 1991: A woman at war as man in tram (not occurs in ending subtitles)

External links 
 Robert Moskwa at filmpolski.pl

1965 births
Living people
Actors from Wrocław
Polish male television actors